Roper Technologies, Inc. (formerly Roper Industries, Inc.) is an American diversified industrial company that produces engineered products for global niche markets. The company is headquartered in Sarasota, Florida.

Roper provides a wide range of products and services to customers in over 100 countries. The company has four main business lines: Industrial Technology, Radio Frequency (RF) Technology, Scientific and Industrial Imaging, and Energy Systems and Controls. Roper joined the Russell 1000 index in 2004, and has annual revenues of more than US$1.23 billion, as of 2017.

History 
George D. Roper founded the company in 1890, primarily as a manufacturer of home appliances, pumps, and other industrial products. Roper initiated a corporate acquisition program, supported by an initial public offering, in 1992.

In 1906 George D. Roper acquires Trahern Pump Co.

In 1957 George D. Roper sold its stove business to The Florence Stove Co. of Kankakee, Il. It would continue to operate under the name George D. Roper. This would leave the other products with the original company changing its name to Roper Pump Company.

In 1966, George D. Roper entered the outdoor lawn equipment acquiring David Bradley Manufacturing Works from Sears.

In 1981 Roper Pump Co. reorganized to Roper Industries.

In 1982, Roper moved its (originally Florence Stove Company) appliance production factory at 2207 W Station, Kankakee, IL to a LaFayette, Georgia plant. The Kankakee factory was razed in 2016.

In 1988, a battle began as General Electric and Whirlpool fought to acquire Roper for its appliances and yard equipment. In 1989, Whirlpool Corporation acquired the Roper brand.

In 1988, Electrolux purchased Roper's lawn and garden products division. Roper was added to Husqvarna and Poulan/Weedeater divisions forming the new brand American Yard Products.

In 2001, Brian Jellison, a former executive of General Electric and Ingersoll-Rand, joined Roper as chief executive officer. The previous holding company business strategy has been replaced with an operating company model.  Since 2001 Roper has completed acquisitions accounting for over half its revenues, establishing the company in global growth markets, such as radio frequency identification (RFID) and water.. Jellison died on November 2, 2018 after a brief illness.

Roper acquired Sunquest Information Systems, a maker of diagnostic and laboratory software for $1.42 billion in cash in 2012.

April 24, 2015 Roper Industries Inc. changed its corporate name to Roper Technologies, Inc.

In August 2020, Roper has agreed to acquire Vertafore, an insurance software maker, in a cash transaction valued at approximately $5.35 billion.

In August 2022, Roper entered an agreement to acquire Frontline Education for 3.725 billion dollars.

Subsidiaries

DAP Technologies
DAP Technologies manufactures rugged mobile computers, including portable data terminals, and tablet computers.  DAP's computers are designed for harsh environments, so they can be used in logistics operations, transportation, warehouses, field service, utilities, law enforcement, and the energy industry, as well as other applications.

DAP distributes its computers in more than 60 countries, and operates subsidiaries in Paris, France, Abingdon, England, and Tokyo, Japan. The company employs 150 people.

Media Cybernetics 
Media Cybernetics is a company in Maryland, United States, founded in 1981, that produces image processing software used worldwide for industrial, scientific, medical, and biotechnology applications. In the early 1980s, they developed and published Dr. Halo, a popular raster graphics editor for the IBM PC. In recent years, Media Cybernetics acquired the assets of Definitive Imaging, QED Imaging and AutoQuant Imaging.

Princeton Instruments
Princeton Instruments, Princeton Instruments,  manufactures scientific imaging equipment, optical coatings, optical cameras, CCD and EMCCD cameras, spectroscopy instrumentation, and electronic sub-assemblies.

Princeton Instruments is divided into these application-specific groups:

Imaging Group provides cameras for applications that include Astronomy, BEC, Combustion, PIV, Single Molecule, Surface and Material Analysis, PSP, and Nanotechnology. 
Spectroscopy Group provides spectrometers, cameras and systems for Raman, LIBS, NIR, Absorption, Fluorescence, and Luminescence.
X-Ray Group manufactures cameras for EUV, Lithography, XRS, Plasma, Diffraction, Microscopy, and Tomography applications.
Industrial Group provides MEGAPLUS cameras for Semiconductor, Web Inspection, Document and Film Capture, Digital Radiography, and Ophthalmology.
Acton Optics & Coatings provides optical components for Medical, Semiconductor, Material Processing, Analytical Instrumentation, Aerospace, and Defense applications.
The company has based in Trenton, New Jersey and Acton, Massachusetts.

Roper Pump Co.
Roper Pump Co. is part of the founding company from which Roper Industries began.  George D. Roper began the company by founding the Roper legacy by entering into part ownership in the Van Wie Gas Stove Company of Cleveland, Ohio.  The Van Wie plant moved to Rockford Illinois and passed into trusteeship in the early 1890s.  George D. Roper became sole owner of the Van Wie Gas Stove company after the company's debts were paid off on September 1, 1894.  A fire completely destroyed the facilities ten days later.  The factory was rebuilt and named the Eclipse Gas Stove Company, and later expanded to include the Trahern Pump Company in 1906.  The Trahern Pump Company, founded in 1857, would evolve to become Roper Pumps Co., currently located in Commerce, Georgia, United States, North America.

Roper Pump Co. mainly manufactures downhole progressing cavity pumps used in oil drilling, flow dividers used in power generation, and gear pumps used on tanker rail cars and tanker trucks.  Roper Pump Co. is a US producer of small diameter progressing cavity pumps, flow dividers, and gear pumps.

TransCore and DAT Solutions 
TransCore is a subsidiary of Roper Industries, based in Nashville, Tennessee, that specializes in intelligent transportation systems (ITS). TransCore was acquired by Roper Industries in 2004.

Roper has divided TransCore into two units: TransCore; and DAT Solutions. TransCore manages RFID transponders and readers.  In this family, their original product line reflects their acquisition of Amtech Systems in 2000 (also a supplier of production and automation systems for the manufacture of solar cells).  These transponders come in a plastic case, for either windshield or external mounting.  Their newer line is the SeGo windshield sticker transponder system, which is a low-cost, batteryless system designed for one-time attachment to a windshield.  These transponders are found in electronic toll collection, fleet tracking, payment, parking and access control applications.

In addition, TransCore has a substantial services business, designing, building and operating ITS facilities.  This may be a complete electronic toll collection system, with design, build, transponders, equipment, customer service and violation enforcement, or any part of it.  For example, TransCore operates the ETC systems for several E-ZPass members, even though E-ZPass has an exclusive contract with another manufacturer for transponders.

DAT Solutions 
DAT Solutions offers freight load boards products for owner-operators, carriers, brokers, shippers, and 3PLs. The underlying framework is the DAT Network, the first electronic freight posting service, acquired in 2001 from the Jubitz Corporation. DAT Solutions began as Dial-A-Truck, a load board operated at the Jubitz Truck Stop in Portland, Oregon. It evolved to become the original and largest internet load board, a matchmaking service for freight loads and trucks. DAT Solutions offers several load board products including: DAT Power, DAT Express and TruckersEdge. Since 2010, DAT has been offering data analytics products, including RateView, based on the more than 500 million loads and trucks posted on the load board annually.

The CBORD Group, Inc.
Roper acquired The CBORD Group, Inc. on February 21, 2008, followed later in the year by acquisition of its K-12 sister company Horizon Software International, LLC. CBORD was founded in Ithaca, NY in 1975.  CBORD products are used for food services, campus ID privilege control, security, residential life, and on/off-campus commerce for K-12 and higher education, acute and long-term healthcare, corporate facilities, and other campus-based institutions.  The products include CS Gold, CS Access, Odyssey, Foodservice Suite, Webfood, Nutrition Service Suite, Room Service Choice, NetMenu, NetNutrition, C-Store, EventMaster, GET, UGryd, CBORD Patient, OneSource, Horizon School Technology, MyPaymentsPlus, MilleniumPlus, and GeriMenu.

CBORD has offices in: Ithaca, NY; Duluth, GA; Canton, OH; Waco, TX; and Sydney, Australia.

CBORD made headlines in 2019 with its campus card integration in Apple wallet  and its partnership with nonprofit Swipe Out Hunger, to enable college students to donate meals to other students in need via technology.

IPA
Founded in 1995, IPA (Innovative Product Achievements, LLC) is the manufacturer of automated surgical scrub and linen dispensing equipment for healthcare providers. Headquartered in Duluth, Georgia, the company employs 130 people.

Compressor Controls Corporation (CCC)
Compressor Controls Corporation (CCC) has specialized in turbomachinery controls for over 35 years. CCC is involved in a broad range of industries including oil, gas, chemical, petrochemical, refineries, LNG, pipelines, steel mills, pharmaceutical, machine-building, and power generation facilities. CCC also constructs new turbomachinery controls and retrofit existing equipment.

iTradeNetwork
A provider of supply chain management and intelligence solutions to the food industry with offices both in the US and UK.

Neptune Technology Group, Inc
Manufacturer of water meters, meter-reading equipment, software, and related equipment, based in Tallassee, Alabama.

Data Innovations
Headquartered in South Burlington, Vermont, DI provides healthcare software.

Verathon, Inc. 
Verathon is a global medical device company. Two areas where Verathon has significantly impacted patient care, and become the market leader in each, are airway management and bladder volume measurement. Verathon, a subsidiary of Roper Technologies, is headquartered in Bothell, Washington, and has international subsidiaries in Canada, Europe and Asia.

ConstructConnect 
ConstructConnect is a construction management software company that is based out of Cincinnati. It is currently run by CEO Matt Strazza. ConstructConnect was acquired by Roper on October 31, 2016.

References

External links 

Companies listed on the New York Stock Exchange
Manufacturing companies based in Florida
Technology companies of the United States
Photography companies of the United States
Automatic identification and data capture
American companies established in 1808
Conglomerate companies of the United States
Manufacturing companies established in 1808